The 2005 Frankfurt Galaxy season was the 13th season for the franchise in the NFL Europe League (NFLEL). The team was led by head coach Mike Jones in his second year, and played its home games at Waldstadion in Frankfurt, Germany. They finished the regular season in fifth place with a record of three wins and seven losses.

Offseason

Free agent draft

Personnel

Staff

Roster

Schedule

Standings

Game summaries

Week 1: at Berlin Thunder

Week 2: vs Amsterdam Admirals

Week 3: at Cologne Centurions

Week 4: vs Hamburg Sea Devils

Week 5: vs Rhein Fire

Week 6: at Amsterdam Admirals

Week 7: vs Cologne Centurions

Week 8: at Rhein Fire

Week 9: vs Berlin Thunder

Week 10: at Hamburg Sea Devils

Notes

References

Frankfurt
Frankfurt Galaxy seasons